René Van Den Driessche (born 14 August 1928) is a Belgian fencer. He competed at the 1960 and 1964 Summer Olympics.

References

External links
 

1928 births
Possibly living people
Belgian male fencers
Belgian épée fencers
Olympic fencers of Belgium
Fencers at the 1960 Summer Olympics
Fencers at the 1964 Summer Olympics
People from Uccle
Sportspeople from Brussels